The Unbreakable Tour was the third concert tour by Irish pop band Westlife seen by 700,000 fans making £14,000,000 which covered the UK and Europe in 2003. There were 62 tour dates, including a few outside concerts including their coming home concerts in their home towns of Dublin and Sligo. This tour was the band's biggest production to date and featured a futuristic sci-fi stage complete with Andy Warhol inspired pop art projections, Las Vegas-style neon signs and the latest in intelligent lighting technology which cost £7 million. This was Brian McFadden's last concert tour as a member of the group.

Setlist
Set 1
"When You're Looking Like That"
"If I Let You Go"
"Tonight"
"Flying Without Wings"
Set 2
"My Love"
"Bop Bop Baby"
"Queen of My Heart"
"To Be with You"
Set 3
Medley
"I Get Around" - Nicky
"Do You Love Me" - Bryan
"Twist and Shout" - Shane
"Great Balls of Fire" - Kian
"Kiss" - Mark
Set 4
"Fool Again"
"Swear It Again"
"Written in the Stars"
"Unbreakable"
Encore
"Uptown Girl"
"What Makes a Man"
"World of Our Own"

Tour dates

Cancellations and rescheduled shows

Video release

Features
 Games (containing exclusive footage)
 Miss You Nights (video)
 Tonight (video)
 Tonight – Remix (video)
 Hey Whatever (video)
 Alternative Edit of When You're Looking Like That
 Documentary
 Interactive Game
 English Dolby Digital 5.1
 English Dolby Digital 2.0
 English Audio Commentary Dolby Digital
Aspect Ratio: 1.78:1
Aspect Ratio: 1.85:1
Discs: 1
Format: PAL
Layers: 1
Running Time: 90 minutes
Transfer Aspect Ratio: 16:9

Credits
 Management: Louis Walsh Management Company
 Director: Russell Thomas
 Executive Producer: Robin Wilson
 Producer: Sara Martin
 Support Act: Zoo

Chart performance

Certifications and sales

References

Westlife concert tours
2003 concert tours